Blandine L'Hirondel (born 3 March 1991) is a French trail runner. In 2019, she won the women's event at the 2019 Trail World Championships held in Miranda do Corvo, Portugal.

In that same year, she also won the bronze medal in her event at the 2019 World Long Distance Mountain Running Championships held in Villa La Angostura, Argentina.

In 2020, she won the women's race at the 2020 French Mountain Running Championships.

In 2022 she won CCC at UTMB and the 2021 Trail World Championships held in November 2022 in Thailand.

References 

Living people
1991 births
French female mountain runners
IAU Trail World Championships winners
21st-century French women